Kim Hui-seon or Kim Hui-son (김희선) may refer to:
 Kim Hui-seon (athlete) (born 1963), South Korean female athlete
 Kim Heesun (born 1972), South Korean female novelist and pharmacist
 Kim Hee-sun (born 1977), South Korean actress